Shoot First, Die Later is a 1974 Italian poliziottesco-noir film directed by Fernando Di Leo.  Di Leo reprises some elements of the novel Rogue Cop by William P. McGivern.  Luc Merenda later starred in two other Di Leo's films, Kidnap Syndicate and Nick the Sting.

Plot 
A policeman who has dealings with local crime begins to get in over his head. At first content with taking payments for helping contraband tobacco and alcohol escape notice of the authorities, he draws the line when the criminals get into the drug smuggling business. A local busybody has inadvertently witnessed the disposal of one of their victims and reported their licence plates to the policeman's father, who is a sergeant. Gradually more people around him turn up dead and he becomes increasingly desperate.

Cast 
Luc Merenda: Domenico Malacarne
Delia Boccardo: Sandra
Richard Conte: Mazzoni
Raymond Pellegrin: Pascal
Vittorio Caprioli: Esposito
Salvo Randone: Marshal Malacarne, father of Domenico
Gianni Santuccio: Quaestor 
Elio Zamuto: Rio
Marisa Traversi: Countess Nevio
Aldo Valletti

Release
Shoot First, Die Later was distributed theatrically in Italy by Titanus on 22 March 1974. The film grossed a total of 675,994,000 Italian lire on its domestic release.

See also
 List of Italian films of 1974

Notes

References

External links

1974 films
1974 crime films
1970s crime action films
1970s Italian-language films
Films directed by Fernando Di Leo
Poliziotteschi films
Films scored by Luis Bacalov
Films with screenplays by Sergio Donati
1970s Italian films